Asiahn Bryant (previously Asia Bryant and born November 24, 1987) is an American singer-songwriter from Paterson, New Jersey, currently signed to the SinceThe80s and Motown record labels. Since 2021, alongside her music, she provides vocal performances for Karma Grant in the Ludacris-created Netflix streaming musical series, Karma's World.

Early life
Asiahn Bryant was born in Paterson, New Jersey, and moved with her family to Charlotte, North Carolina as a baby. She used music as an outlet while dealing with the divorce of her parents and the death of her brother.
Bryant is openly lesbian.

Musical career
In the early stages of Asiahn Bryant's music career, she met Craig King who took her under his wing worked on her artistic development with A&R James Bennett. She started touring a few years later and opened up for Ludacris, T.I., Kanye West, and Erykah Badu. In 2010 and 2011, she featured on background vocals for Quincy Jones' Q: Soul Bossa Nostra and Killer Mike's PL3DGE. In 2011, Asiahn Bryant began her mainstream musical career by signing a publishing deal with Universal Music Group, and releasing her debut extended play (EP) album Analog Girl X Digital World on June 7 that year under the Motown record label.

In 2013, she was a co-songwriter on "Hands in the Air", a song by Miley Cyrus from her album Bangerz. In 2014, she co-wrote the "Booty" and "Girls" singles for Jennifer Lopez. In 2015, Asiahn Bryant worked with The Game and was featured on the latter's albums Compton and The Documentary 2.5. She contributed vocal performances on Ludaversal, an album by Ludacris. In 2016, she worked on two Fox musical drama TV series, first collaborating with Ne-Yo as a co-writer on a soundtrack for the second season of Empire, then co-writing songs for Star the following year.

In 2017, Bryant released her second EP Love Train produced by Cardiak. Both continued to work together on the sequel Love Train 2, which was released in 2019. On 11 January 2021, Asiahn released The Interlude EP distributed by SinceThe80s and Motown, which featured guest appearances from Grandmaster Vic and Jordan Hawkins. Following the release of the EP, she debuted at on the Billboard Emerging Artists Spotlight. On March 18, she released a live version of the EP with orchestral performances of each song.

Non-musical career 
From mid-2021, alongside her music, she was cast as and began providing vocal performances for Karma Grant in a Netflix computer-animated musical series, Karma's World, created by Ludacris (who himself provides the voice of her dad in the series). Both worked on a song which is featured on its official soundtrack album, whiles Asiahn alone worked on the rest of the entries of that album, including the theme song which has its own music video released on YouTube. The Karma's World soundtrack album is currently the only album Asiahn features in, either as the lead or back-up, not released by either SinceThe80s or Motown.

Discography

Studio albums

Extended plays

Soundtrack album

Singles

As lead artist

Guest appearances

Writing discography

References

External links 

1987 births
Living people
21st-century American women singers
20th-century African-American women singers
American hip hop singers
Musicians from Paterson, New Jersey
Musicians from Charlotte, North Carolina
21st-century African-American women
American voice actresses